Irazusta is a village and municipality in Entre Ríos Province in north-eastern Argentina.

References

Populated places in Entre Ríos Province